The Alley Cats may refer to:

 The Yale Alley Cats, an all-male a cappella singing group from Yale University founded in 1943
 The Alley Cats (1960s group), a 1960s musical group
 The Alley Cats (doo-wop group), a doo-wop group
 The Alley Cats (punk rock band), a punk rock band
 Alleycats (Malaysian rock band), a Malaysian band
 The Alley Cats (film), a 1966 American film

See also 
Alley cat (disambiguation)